Kentucky Christian University (KCU) is a private Christian university in Grayson, Kentucky.  It was founded on December 1, 1919, as Christian Normal Institute, by J. W. Lusby and J. O. Snodgrass. As a "normal school" its programs included a high school, a junior college, and a training program for public school teachers.  During the early 1920s its emphasis shifted to educating students for the Christian ministry.  Degree programs are offered in six schools within the university: the Sack School of Bible and Ministry, the School of Business, the Keeran School of Education, the School of Distance and General Education, the Yancey School of Nursing, and the School of Social Work and Human Services.

The name was changed to Kentucky Christian College in 1944. In September, 2004, the institution changed its name from Kentucky Christian College to Kentucky Christian University.

KCU is accredited by the Commission on Colleges of the Southern Association of Colleges and Schools and is authorized to award bachelor's and master's degrees.  All programs requiring professional licensure (i.e. Nursing, Social Work, and Teacher Education) are professionally accredited.

Twice weekly mandatory chapel services are an important part of the KCU experience and contribute to a sense of community on campus. The university is also well known for the magnitude of their worship leaders, their Christian nursing program, and athletic programs (football, men's and women's basketball, men's and women's soccer, women's volleyball, archery, softball, baseball, cheerleading, men's and women's golf, bass fishing, and cross country/track and field.)

Athletics

The Kentucky Christian athletic teams are called the Knights and Lady Knights. The university is a member of the National Association of Intercollegiate Athletics (NAIA), primarily competing in the Appalachian Athletic Conference (AAC) since the 2019–20 academic year. They were also a member of the National Christian College Athletic Association (NCCAA), primarily competing as an independent in the Mid-East Region of the Division II level. The Knights and Lady Knights previously competed as an NAIA Independent within the Association of Independent Institutions (AII) from 2008–09 (when the school joined the NAIA) to 2018–19.

Kentucky Christian competes in 17 intercollegiate varsity sports: Men's sports include baseball, basketball, cross country, football, golf, soccer and track & field; while women's sports include basketball, cheerleading, cross country, golf, soccer, softball, track and field and volleyball; and co-ed sports compete in archery, bass fishing and cheerleading.

Women's basketball
The women's basketball team has won 15 NCCAA Division II National Championships since 1989.

Notable alumni
Several contemporary Christian music groups have come from KCU, including Audio Adrenaline and Bleach.

References

External links
 Official website
 Official athletics website

 
Buildings and structures in Carter County, Kentucky
Private universities and colleges in Kentucky
Educational institutions established in 1919
Universities and colleges affiliated with the Christian churches and churches of Christ
Universities and colleges accredited by the Southern Association of Colleges and Schools
Education in Carter County, Kentucky
Council for Christian Colleges and Universities
1919 establishments in Kentucky